Joseph Vaea Tangitau Falemaka (born 8 February 1985), also known by the nickname of "Joey", is a Tongan former professional rugby league footballer who played in the 2000s, as a .

Falemaka appeared for Tonga in the 2006 Federation Shield competition.

Falemaka made 15 appearances for The North Sydney Bears in The 2007 NSW New South Wales Cup

References

External links
St. George Illawarra Dragons profile

1985 births
Living people
Rugby league props
Tonga national rugby league team players
Tongan rugby league players